The Golden Melody Jury Award (Chinese: 金曲獎評審團獎) is a Golden Melody Award presented by the Ministry of Culture of Taiwan, established in the 18th Golden Melody Awards in 2007 to honor an extraordinary body of work that the jury decides to be unique and exemplary. According to the Golden Melody Award, the award does not objectively judge under a set of criteria, but can only hand out the award if more than two-thirds of the jury decides to recognize the work after review and discussion. The award is not given if the jury does not meet a consensus.

At the 25th Golden Melody Awards, Taiwanese rapper Dwagie's "Refuse to Listen (不聽)" and Jonathan Lee's "Hills (山丘)" each received nine to nine votes from the judges. Since three judges abstained, it did not meet the consensus so the award was not given during the ceremony.

Recipients

Jury Prize (18th-present)

References 

Golden Melody Awards